Conospermum ephedroides is a shrub endemic to Western Australia.

It blooms between August and October producing white-blue-pink flowers.

It is found in the Wheatbelt region of Western Australia where it grows in sandy, loamy and gravelly soils.

References

External links

ephedroides
Endemic flora of Western Australia
Eudicots of Western Australia
Plants described in 1855
Taxa named by Carl Meissner